This is a list of musical compositions for cello and orchestra ordered by their authors' surnames.

List of cello concertos and concertante pieces

A
Torstein Aagaard-Nilsen
Cello Concerto (1996)
Louis Abbiate
Cello Concerto (1895)
Carl Friedrich Abel
Cello Concerto in B flat
Cello Concerto in C
Hans Abrahamsen
Lied in Fall
Thomas Adès
Lieux retrouvés (2016)
Vasif Adigozalov
Cello Concerto (1990)
Samuel Adler (b. 1928)
Concerto for Cello and Orchestra (1995)
Jean-Louis Agobet
Cello Concerto (2009)
Vladimir Agopov
Cello Concerto (1987)
Miguel del Aguila (b. 1957)
Concierto en Tango for Cello and Orchestra (2014)
Kalevi Aho
 Cello Concerto No. 1 (1983–84)
 Cello Concerto No. 2 (2013)
Ikram Akbarov
Cello Concerto (1990)
Yasushi Akutagawa
Concerto ostinato for cello and orchestra (1969)

Eugen d'Albert
Cello Concerto in C, Op. 20  (1899)
Stephen Albert
Cello Concerto (1990)
Redzhep Allayarov 
Cello Concerto (1985)
Pedro Humberto Allende Saron
Cello Concerto (1915)
Ferid Alnar
Cello Concerto (1943)
 Franghiz Ali-Zadeh
 Concerto for cello and orchestra (2000–2001)
 André Amellér
 Concerto for cello and orchestra (1946), version for chamber orchestra (1963)
 Gilbert Amy
 Cello Concerto (1999–2000)
Tanya Anisimova
 Adonai for Solo Cello and String Orchestra (2006)
Quintet Concerto for Solo Cello and String Quintet (2005)
Denis ApIvor
Cello Concerto (1977)
Johann Gottfried Arnold
Cello Concerto No.1 in C
Cello Concerto No.2 in G
Cello Concerto No.3 in F
Cello Concerto No.4 in E flat
Cello Concerto No.5 in D
Malcolm Arnold
Cello Concerto
 Alexander Arutiunian
 Concertino for cello and orchestra (1971)
 Poem for cello and orchestra (1974)
Kurt Atterberg
 Cello Concerto in C minor, Op. 21 (1922)
Daniel-Francois-Esprit Auber
Air varié for cello and orchestra (1807)
5 Concertos for Cello
Pedro António Avondano
Cello Concerto in G
Vaja Azarashvili 
Concerto for cello and chamber orchestra

B
 Arno Babajanian
 Cello Concerto (1962)
Grażyna Bacewicz
Cello Concerto No. 1 (1951)
Cello Concerto No. 2 (1963)
Carl Philipp Emanuel Bach
Cello Concerto in A minor (1750)
Cello Concerto in B-flat major (1751)
Cello Concerto in A major (1753)
Johann Christian Bach
Concerto in C minor (Casadesus forgery)
Sven-Erik Bäck
Cello Concerto (1966)
Nicolas Bacri
Cello Concerto (1987)
Henk Badings
Cello Concerto No. 1 (1930)
Cello Concerto No. 2 (1939)
David N. Baker
Concerto for Cello and Chamber Orchestra (1975) (Commissioned by Janos Starker)
Concerto for Cello and Jazz Band (1987) (Commissioned by Ed Laut)
Leonardo Balada
Cello Concerto No. 1 (1962)
Cello Concerto No. 2 New Orleans (2001)
Christopher Ball
Cello Concerto No.1
Cello Concerto No.2
Alexander Baltin
Cello Concerto (1971)
Gennady Banshchikov
Cello Concerto No.1 (1962)
Cello Concerto No.2 (1964)
Cello Concerto No.3 (1965)
Cello Concerto No.4 for cello and 11 instruments Duodeciment (1966)
Granville Bantock
Sapphic Poem for cello and orchestra (1909)
George Barati
Cello Concerto (1953)
Samuel Barber
Cello Concerto in A minor, Op. 22 (1945)
Béla Bartók
Cello Concerto (arrangement of the Viola Concerto by Tibor Serly – 1945)
Rhapsody 1
Leonid Bashmakov
Cello Concerto (1972)
Veniamin Basner
Cello Concerto (1989)
Stanley Bate
Cello Concerto (1953)
Mason Bates
Cello Concerto (2014)
Jerzy Bauer 
Cello Concerto No.1 (1985)
Cello Concerto No.2 (2013)
Arnold Bax
Cello Concerto in G minor (1932)
Stephen W. Beatty
Five Cello Concertos (2014-6)
Louis-Noël Belaubre 
Concerto for cello and strings after Boccherini's sonata in C
Gustaf Bengtsson
Cello Concerto (1932)
Paul Ben-Haim
Concerto
Pascal Bentoiu
Cello Concerto (1989)
Niels Viggo Bentzon
Cello Concerto No.1 (1956)
Cello Concerto No.2 (1974)
Cello Concerto No.3 (1982)
Esteban Benzecry
Concertino for cello and strings (1992)
Cello Concerto (2013)
Wilhelm Georg Berger
Cello Concerto (1967)
Erik Bergman
Cello Concerto
Concerto for Cello and String Orchestra Op.141 (1998)
Luciano Berio
Ritorno degli snovidenia (The Return of Dreams 1977)
Michael Berkeley
Cello Concerto (1983)
Leonard Bernstein
Three Meditations from Mass for cello and orchestra (1977)
Charles Roland Berry
Cello Concerto (published 2008)
Boris Blacher
Cello Concerto (1964)
David Blake
Cello Concerto (1992)
Howard Blake
Diversions for cello and orchestra (1985)
Marc Bleuse
Cello Concerto (1993)
Arthur Bliss
Cello Concerto F 107 (1970)
Ernest Bloch
Schelomo, Rhapsodie Hébraïque for cello solo and large orchestra (1916)
Voice in the Wilderness (1936)
Luigi Boccherini
Cello Concerto No. 1 in C major, G. 477
Cello Concerto No. 2 in D major, G. 479
Cello Concerto No. 3 in G major, G. 480
Cello Concerto No. 4 in C major, G. 481
Cello Concerto No. 5 in E-flat major, G. 474
Cello Concerto No. 6 in A major, G 475
Cello Concerto No. 7 in D major, G. 476
Cello Concerto No. 8 in D major, G. 478
Cello Concerto No. 9 in B-flat major, G. 482
Cello Concerto in B-flat major (arr. F. Grutzmacher)
Cello Concerto No. 10 in D major, G. 483
Cello Concerto No. 11 in C major, G. 573
Cello Concerto No. 12 in E-flat major
Leon Boëllmann
Variations Symphoniques, Op. 23
Joseph Bodin de Boismortier
Cello Concerto Op.26. No.6 (published 1729)
Max Bohrer 
Cello Concerto No.1
Nimrod Borenstein
Concerto for violoncello and string orchestra opus 56b (2012)
Cello concerto No. 2 opus 77 (2017)
Lilcho Borisov
Cello Concerto (1984)
Pavel Bořkovec
Cello Concerto (1952)
Sergei Bortkiewicz
Cello Concerto, Op. 20 (1915)
 Three Pieces for cello and orchestra, Op. 25A: (1922)
 Daniel Börtz
 Concerto for cello and strings (1980)
Henriëtte Bosmans
Cello Concerto No.1 (1922)
Cello Concerto No.2 (1924)
Poème (1926)
Antoon Bouman
Cello Concerto No.1 (1882)
Hendrik Bouman
Cello Concerto in A minor for cello and strings (2005)()
York Bowen
Rhapsody for Cello and Orchestra, Op. 74
George Frederick Boyle
Cello Concerto (1917)
Eugène Bozza
Cello Concerto (1947)
Joly Braga Santos
Cello Concerto (1987)
Thérèse Brenet
Le Retour De Quetzalcoatl, symphonic poem for cello and orchestra (1995)
Concerto for cello and small orchestra (2010)
Jean-Baptiste Bréval
Cello Concerto No. 1, A, Op. 14 (1784)
Cello Concerto No. 2, D, Op. 17 (1784)
Cello Concerto No. 3, F, Op. 20 (1785)
Cello Concerto No. 4, C, Op. 22 (1786)
Cello Concerto No. 5, Op. 24 (1786)
Cello Concerto No. 6, C, Op. 26 (1786)
Havergal Brian
Cello Concerto in E-flat (1964)
Frank Bridge
Oration, concerto elegiaco for cello and orchestra (1930)
Suite for cello and orchestra (orch. Robert Cornford, 1982)
Benjamin Britten
Cello Symphony, Op. 68 (1963)
Dirk Brossé
Elegy For Cello and Strings (1994)
Double concerto for Cello and Clarinet (2000)
Concerto fir Isabelle (2015)
Tobias Broström
Cello Concerto (2013)
Alexander Brott
Cello Concerto Evocative Provocations (1975)
Stephen Brown
Concerto for Two Cellos in G minor, "The Big Twin" (2016)
Max Bruch
Kol Nidre, Op. 47 (late 1880)
Canzone, Op. 55 (about 1891)
Adagio after Celtic themes, Op. 56
Ave Maria, Op. 61 (1892)
Fritz Brun
Cello Concerto (1947)
Joanna Bruzdowicz
Cello Concerto The Cry of the Phoenix (1994)
Gavin Bryars
Cello Concerto (1995)
Rudolph Bubalo 
Concerto for cello and chamber orchestra (1992)
Gunnar Bucht
Cello Concerto No.1 (1954)
Cello Concerto No.2 (1990)
Julius Bürger
Cello Concerto (1938)
Geoffrey Burgon
Cello Concerto (2007)
William Busch
Cello Concerto (1941)
Geoffrey Bush
Sinfonietta Concertante (1943)

C
Antonio Caldara
Cello Concerto in D minor
Roger Calmel 
Cello Concerto (1968)
Edith Canat de Chizy
Moïra (1998)
André Caplet
Epiphanie for cello and orchestra (1923)
Dumitru Capoianu
Cello Concerto (2001)
David Carlson
Cello Concerto No. 1 (1979) (Carl Fischer Music)
Cello Concerto No. 2 for cello and 15 strings (1997) (Carl Fischer Music)
Elliott Carter
Cello Concerto (2000)
Robert Casadesus
Cello Concerto (1947)
André Casanova 
Cello Concerto (1983)
Alfredo Casella
Cello Concerto (1934–35)
Philip Cashian
Concerto for cello and Strings (2012)
John Casken
 Cello Concerto (1991)
Gaspar Cassadó
 Cello Concerto in D minor (1926)
Joseph Castaldo
 Cello Concerto (1995)
Mario Castelnuovo Tedesco
Cello Concerto, Op. 72 in G minor (1935)
Manuel Castillo
Cello Concerto
Ricardo Castro
Cello Concerto (1895)
 Yi Chen
 Eleanor's Gift concerto for cello and orchestra (1999)
Friedrich Cerha
Konzert (1989-1996)
Shirvani Chalayev
Cello Concerto No.1 (1970)
Cello Concerto No.2 (1975)
Carlos Chávez
Cello Concerto (unfinished, 1975)
Gordon Shi-Wen Chin
Cello Concerto No.1 (2006)
Unsuk Chin
 Cello Concerto (2009/2013)
 Giovanni Battista Cirri
 Six cello concertos (Op. 14, Nos. 1–6)
Walter Civitareale
Cello Concerto (1986)
 Anna Clyne
 DANCE for cello and orchestra (2019)
Guillaume Connesson
Cello Concerto (2008)
Dinos Constantinides
Cello Concerto China IV-Shenzhen (1992)
Barry Conyngham
Concerto for cello and strings (1984)
Arnold Cooke
Cello Concerto (1973)
Frank Corcoran
Cello Concerto (2014)
Ronald Corp
Cello Concerto (2014)
François Couperin-Paul Bazelaire
 Pieces en concert for Cello and Strings
Jean Cras
Légende (1929)
Lyell Cresswell
Cello Concerto (1984)
Gordon Crosse
Cello Concerto (1979)
César Cui
Deux morceaux Op.36 (1886)
Andrzej Cwojdziński 
Cello Concerto No.1 (1965)
Cello Concerto No.2 (1968)
Cello Concerto No.3 (1993)

D

Marc-André Dalbavie
Cello Concerto (2013)
Luigi Dallapiccola
Dialoghi (1960)
Peter Maxwell Davies
Strathclyde Concerto No. 2 (1987)
Karl Davydov
 Cello Concerto No. 1 in B minor, Op. 5 (1859)
 Cello Concerto No. 2 in A minor, Op. 14 (1863)
 Cello Concerto No. 3 in D, Op. 18 (1868)
 Cello Concerto No. 4 in E minor, Op. 31 (1878)
Richard Danielpour
 Cello Concerto No. 1 (1990)
Cello Concerto No. 2 – Through the Ancient Valley (2001)
Franz Danzi
Cello Concerto G
Cello Concerto A major
Cello Concerto E minor
Variations on Mozart's Là ci darem la mano from Don Giovanni 
Brett Dean
Cello Concerto (2018)
Dan Dediu
Cello Concerto (2019)
Théo De Joncker
Cello Concerto
 Frederick Delius
 Cello Concerto (1921) 
Caprice and Elegy (1930)
 Louis Delune
 Cello Concerto (published 1927)
Edison Denisov
 Cello Concerto, Op. 44 (1972)
 Variations on Haydn's Canon "Death is a Long Sleep" for cello and orchestra (1982)
Gion Antoni Derungs
Cello Concerto (2004)
Pavle Dešpalj
Concerto for cello and string orchestra (2001)
Alon Deutsch
Cello Concerto (2018)
Bernd Richard Deutsch
Cello Concerto (2019)
Frédéric Devreese
Concertino for cello, bandoneón and string orchestra (1998)
Concerto for cello and orchestra (1999)
David Diamond
Cello Concerto (1938)
Kaddish for cello and orchestra (1987)
Bernard van Dieren
Elegy for cello and orchestra
Albert Dietrich
Cello Concerto in G minor, Op. 32
Carl Ditters von Dittersdorf
Cello Concerto D
Paul-Heinz Dittrich
Concerto for cello, string quartet and orchestra (1975)
Georgy Dmitriev
Cello Concerto (1968)
Ernst von Dohnányi
Concertpiece, Op. 12 (1904)
Cornelis Dopper
 Cello Concerto (1910,1923)
Antal Dorati
Cello Concerto (1977)
Friedrich Dotzauer
Cello Concerto in B minor
Cello Concerto in F sharp minor
Dimitris Dragatakis
Cello Concerto (1972)
Pierre Max Dubois
Cello Concerto (1958)
Vernon Duke
 Cello Concerto (1945)
Jean-Louis Duport
 6 cello concertos (No. 4 in E minor, 5 in D major, 6 in D minor)
 Pascal Dusapin
 Cello Concerto "Celo" (1996)
 Cello Concerto "Outscape" (2016)
Henri Dutilleux
 Cello Concerto "Tout un monde lointain..." (1970)
Antonín Dvořák
Cello Concerto in A major, orchestrated by Jarmil Burghauser (1865)
Cello Concerto in B minor, Op. 104 (1894–1895)
Rondo in G minor, Op. 94, B.181 (1893)
Silent Woods, Op. 68, No. 5, B.182 (1893)
George Dyson
Prelude, Fantasy and Chaconne for cello and orchestra (1936)

E
Sixten Eckerberg
Cello Concerto (1973)
Karl Anton Eckert
Cello Concerto
René Eespere
Cello Concerto Concertatus Celatus (2004)
Klaus Egge
 Cello Concerto, Op. 29 (1966)
Werner Egk
Canzona for cello and orchestra (1982)
Halim El-Dabh
The Invisible Bridge: Concerto for Cello and Orchestra (2007)
Edward Elgar
 Cello Concerto in E minor, Op. 85 (1918–1919)
Jose Elizondo
Unter dem Sternenhimmel des Rheins (Under the starry sky of the Rhine) (2020)
Legende des edlen Ritters (The legend of the noble knight) (2020)
Danzas Latinoamericanas (Latin American Dances) (1997)
Otoño en Buenos Aires (Autumn in Buenos Aires) (1997)
Pan de Azúcar (Sugar Loaf mountain) (1997)
Atardecer Tapatío (Sunset in Guadalajara) (1997)
La alborada de la esperanza (The Dawn of Hope) (2018)
Limoncello (2018)
Crepúsculos (Twilights) (2018)
David Ellis
Cello Concerto (1977 rev. 2004)
Jens Laursøn Emborg
Cello Concerto (1949)
George Enescu
Sinfonia Concertante in B minor, Op. 8 (1901)
Einar Englund
Cello Concerto (1954)
Peter Eötvös
Cello Concerto Grosso (2010-2011)
Frederic d'Erlanger
Andante Symphonique for Cello and Orchestra, Op. 18 (1903)
Ballade for Cello and Orchestra (1926)
Iván Erőd
3 movements for Cello and Chamber Orchestra, Op. 7 (12 min) (1958)
Cello Concerto for Cello and Orchestra, Op. 80 ( 25 min) (2005)
Francisco Escudero
Cello Concerto (1971)
 Andrei Eshpai
 Concerto for cello and orchestra (1989) (Dedicated to Mstislav Rostropovich.) (20 min)

F
Sebastian Fagerlund
Nomade - Concerto for Cello and Orchestra
 Mohammed Fairouz
 Akhnaten, Dweller in Truth for cello and orchestra (2011)
 Cello Concerto Desert Sorrows (2015)
 Gabriel Fauré
 Elegie for Cello and Orchestra (1880)
Ivan Fedele
Concerto for cello and orchestra (1996)
Imaginary Depth for cello and chamber orchestra (1997)
Est!, Concerto No. 2 for cello and small orchestra (2004–2005)
Jindřich Feld
Cello Concerto (1958)
 Morton Feldman
 Cello and Orchestra, for Siegfried Palm (1972)
 Václav Felix
 Cello Concerto (1990)
John Fernström
Cello Concerto (1940)
Francesco Filidei
Ogni Gesto d'Amore (2009)
Anton Fils
Cello Concerto in B flat
Cello Concerto in F
Vivian Fine
Chamber Concerto for cello and six instruments (1966)
Gerald Finzi
 Cello Concerto in A minor, Op. 40 (1955)
Nicola Fiorenza
Cello Concerto in A minor
Cello Concerto in B flat
Cello Concerto in F
 Elena Firsova
 Cello Concerto No. 1, Op. 10 (1973)
 Cello Concerto No. 2, Op. 26 (Chamber Concerto No. 2) (1982)
 Cello Concerto No. 3, Op. 78 (Chamber Concerto No. 5) (1996)
 Cello Concerto No.4 Op. 122 (Concerto-Elegy) (2008)
 Nenad Firšt
 Cello Concerto (1994)
 Jerzy Fitelberg
 Cello Concerto (1931)
 Wilhelm Fitzenhagen
 Concerto for Cello and Orchestra No. 1, in B minor (1870)
 Concerto Fantastique, for Cello and Orchestra No. 2, in A minor (1871)
 Concerto for Cello and Orchestra No. 3, in A minor
 Kjell Flem
 Cello Concerto (2005)
 Lukas Florczak
 Cello Concerto (2019)
Jean-Louis Florentz
 Cello Concerto Le Songe de Lluc Alcari (1996)
Franz Flössner
Cello Concerto Op.20
Urs Joseph Flury
Cello Concerto (1977)
Josef Bohuslav Foerster
Cello Concerto (1930)
Juliette Folville (1870–1946)
Concertstuck pour Violoncelle (Concert piece for cello) and orchestra (1905)
Triptych for cello and orchestra (manuscript)
 Arthur Foote (1853–1937)
 Cello Concerto in G minor, Op. 33 (1894)
Carlo Forlivesi
Lauda (2007), Cello Concerto (for Anssi Karttunen)
Lukas Foss
Cello Concerto (1966)
John Foulds
Lento e Scherzetto, Op. 12 (about 1906)
Cello Concerto in G major, Op. 17 (1908–09)
Malcolm Forsyth
Cello Concerto Electra Rising (1995)
Wolfgang Fortner
Concerto for Cello and orchestra (1951)
Zyklus for Cello and Chamber Orchestra without strings (1970)
Luca Francesconi
Rest, Concerto for cello and orchestra (2003)
Unexpected End of Formula, for cello, ensemble and electronics (2008)
Das Ding singt (2017)
Auguste Franchomme
Cello Concerto No.1 (1846)
Jacques Franco-Mendès
Grand Cello Concerto No.3
John Frandsen
Cello Concerto Hymn to the Ice Queen (1998)
Jan Freidlin
Concerto for cello, string orchestra and vibraphone (1994)
Gunnar de Frumerie
 Cello Concerto (1984)
Dai Fujikura
Cello Concerto (2017)
Charles Fussell
Right River (Variations for cello and string orchestra)

G
Bogdan Gagić
Cello Concerto (1987)
Renaud Gagneux
Triptyque (Cello Concerto No.1 1990)
Cello Concerto No.2 (1999)
Hans Gal
Cello Concerto (1944)
Moritz Ganz
Cello Concerto No.2 (published 1836)
Celso Garrido-Lecca
Cello Concerto (1994)
John Garth
Cello Concerto No. 1 in D (1760)
Cello Concerto No. 2 in B flat (1760)
Cello Concerto No. 3 in A (1760)
Cello Concerto No. 4 in B flat (1760)
Cello Concerto No. 5 in D minor (1760)
Cello Concerto No. 6 in G (1760)
Fritz Geissler
Cello Concerto (1974)
Cello Concertino (1981)
Jiří Gemrot
Cello Concerto (1984)
Concertino for cello, piano and orchestra (2004)
Concerto for cello and chamber orchestra (2009)
Lamento for cello and string orchestra (2012)
Harald Genzmer
Cello Concerto (1950)
Concerto for Cello and Winds (1969)
Friedrich Gernsheim
Cello Concerto in E minor, Op. 78 (1907)
Stefano Gervasoni
Heur, leurre,leuer for cello and orchestra (2013)
Alberto Ginastera
Cello Concerto No. 1, Op. 36 (1968)
Cello Concerto No. 2, Op. 50 (1980)
Paul Glass
Cello Concerto (1961)
 Philip Glass
 Concerto for Cello and Orchestra
Cello Concerto No.2 – Naqoyqatsi
Alexander Glazunov
Concerto-ballata in C, Op. 108 (1931)
Chant du ménestrel, Op. 71 (1901)
Reinhold Glière
Cello Concerto in D minor, Op. 87 (1946)
Alexander Goehr
Romanza for cello and orchestra, Op. 24 (1968)
Daniël van Goens
Cello Concerto No.1 in A minor (1886/7)
Cello Concerto No.2 in D minor (published 1901)
Berthold Goldschmidt
Cello Concerto (1953–54)
Edmunds Goldšteins
Cello Concerto (1963)
Marin Goleminov
Cello Concerto No.1 (1946)
Cello Concerto No.2 (1984)
Jani Golob
Cello Concerto (2001)
Georg Goltermann
Cello Concerto No. 1 in A minor, Op. 14
Cello Concerto No. 2 in D minor, Op. 30
Cello Concerto No. 3 in B minor, Op. 51
Cello Concerto No. 4 in G major, Op. 65
Cello Concerto No. 5 in D minor, Op. 76
(total of 8 Cello Concerti)
Evgeny Golubev
Cello Concerto in D minor, Op. 41 (1956)
Geoffrey Gordon
Concerto For Cello And Orchestra (after Thomas Mann's Doktor Faustus) (2013) 
Ida Gotkovsky
Cello Concerto (1980)
Hermann Grädener
Cello Concerto No.1 (published 1908)
Cello Concerto No.2 (1912)
Paul Graener
Cello Concerto (published 1927)
Friedrich Hartmann Graf
Cello Concerto
Čestmír Gregor 
Cello Concerto (1974)
Edward Gregson
A Song for Chris Concerto for cello and chamber orchestra (2007)
Olivier Greif
Cello Concerto Durch Adams Fall (1999)
Lene Grenager
Cello Concerto (2006)
Alexander Gretchaninov
 Cello Concerto in A minor, Op. 8, 1895
 Johann Konrad Gretsch
 Cello Concerto in C
 Edvard Grieg
 Cello Sonata (1883) orchestrated into a concerto by Joseph Horovitz and Benjamin Wallfisch
Johann Benjamin Gross
Cello Concerto in the form of a Concertino, Op.14
Cello Concerto, Op.31
Cello Concerto, Op.38
Robert Groslot
Cello Concerto (2011)
Heinz Karl Gruber
Cello Concerto (1989)
Jorge Grundman
Concerto for Cello and String Orchestra. Act of Contrition Op. 76 (2021)
Friedrich Grützmacher
Cello Concerto No.1 (1854)
Cello Concerto No.2 (1858)
Cello Concerto No.3 (1859)
Sofia Gubaidulina
Detto-2 for cello and chamber ensemble (1972)
Seven Last Words, Partita for cello, bayan, and string orchestra (1982)
Und: Das Fest ist in vollem Gang (1993)
The Canticles of the Sun for cello, mixed choir and percussions (1997)
Friedrich Gulda
Concerto for Cello and Wind Orchestra (1980)
Christopher Gunning
Cello Concerto (2013)
Manfred Gurlitt
Cello Concerto (after 1933, before 1939)

H
Georg Friedrich Haas
Konzert für Violoncello und Orchester (2003-2004)
Daron Hagen
 Concerto for Cello and Orchestra (1996)
 Concerto for Cello and Wind Ensemble (1998)
Reynaldo Hahn
Cello Concerto (incomplete, 1905)
Cristóbal Halffter
 Partita for Cello and Orchestra (1957) for Gaspar Cassadó
 Concerto for Cello and Orchestra (1974) for Siegfried Palm
 Concerto No. 2 for Cello and Orchestra (1985) for Mstislav Rostropovich
Hafliði Hallgrímsson
Cello Concerto (2003)
Asger Hamerik
 Romance for Cello and Orchestra, Op. 27 (1879)
Johan Hammerth
Cello Concerto (1998)
George Frideric Handel
Concerto in B minor (Casadesus forgery)
John Harbison
Cello Concerto (1993)
Ross Harris
Cello Concerto (2011)
Julius Harrison
Cello Concerto
Emil Hartmann
Cello Concerto in D minor, Op. 26 (1879)
Jonathan Harvey
Cello Concerto (1990)
Christos Hatzis
Confessional for Cello and Orchestra (2001)
Johann Adolph Hasse
Cello Concerto in D
Joseph Haydn
Cello Concerto No. 1 in C major, H. 7b/1
 Cello Concerto No. 2 in D major, H. 7b/2 (Op. 101) (1783)
 Cello Concerto No. 4 in D major, H. 7b/4 (spurious, now thought to be the work of Giovanni Battista Costanzi - see Petrucci Music Library)
Cello Concerto in D major (1772)
(another 2 Haydn Cello Concertos are considered lost)
Michael Haydn
Cello Concerto in B flat
Lennart Hedwall
Concerto for cello and strings (1970)
Friedrich Hegar
Cello Concerto (published 1919)
Paavo Heininen
Deux Chansons (1976)
Cello Concerto (1985)
Gustav Helsted
Cello Concerto (1919)
Hans Werner Henze
Ode and den Westwind (1953)
Englische Liebeslieder (1985)
Introduction, Thema und Variationen, for cello, harp and Strings
Victor Herbert
 Suite for Cello and Orchestra, Op.3 (1882)
 Cello Concerto No. 1 in D, Op. 8 (1882)
 Fantasia on "The Desire" (Schubert) for Cello and Orchestra (1891)
 Légende for Cello and Orchestra (1893)
 Cello Concerto No. 2 in E minor, Op. 30 (1894)
Paul Hermann
Cello Concerto (1925)
Philippe Hersant
 Cello Concerto No. 1 (1989)
 Cello Concerto No. 2 (1996–1997)
Johann Wilhelm Hertel
Cello Concerto in A (1755)
Cello Concerto in A minor (1759)
Sean Hickey
Cello Concerto (2008)
Paul Hindemith
 Cello Concerto Op. 3 (1916)
 Kammermusik #3
 Cello Concerto in G (1940)
Ryōhei Hirose
Cello Concerto Triste (1971)
Emil Hlobil
Cello Concerto (1983)
Vincent Ho 
City Suite: concerto for amplified cello and orchestra (2011)
Three Warriors: concerto for cello trio and strings (2014)
Heinrich Hofmann
Cello Concerto (first published 1875)
Leopold Hofmann
 at least seven cello concertos, in C major (1770s; Badley C1), C major (1771; Badley C2), C major (1760s; Badley C3), C major (1768; Badley C4), D major (1760s or 1771, Badley D1), D major (1760s; Badley D2) and D major (1775, Badley D3) (NYPL and Naxos recording information. Different editions of D1 disagree, apparently. Published in modern times by Artaria, generally edited by Allan Badley.)
Joseph Holbrooke
 Cello Concerto (1936)
Vagn Holmboe
 Cello Concerto, Op. 120 (M. 273 in Paul Rapoport's catalog. 1974/79)
Gustav Holst
 Invocation for Cello and Orchestra, Op. 19, No. 2 (1905)
Ignaz Holzbauer
Cello Concerto in A (published )
Arthur Honegger
Cello Concerto (1929)
Toshio Hosokawa
Cello Concerto (1997)
Chant (2009)
Sublimation (2016)
Stephen Hough
Cello Concerto – The Loneliest Wilderness (2007)
Luc van Hove 
Concerto for cello and chamber ensemble (1998)
Alan Hovhaness
Cello Concerto, Op. 17 (1936)
Gagik Hovunts
Cello Concerto The Harmony of Sound (1976)
Herbert Howells
Cello Concerto (1943–83) (unfinished – First movement entitled Fantasia, and second movement posthumously orchestrated and titled Threnody remain, and can be performed as separate works. A completion was produced in 2012 by Jonathan Clinch (Durham University) )
Peter Hristoskov
Cello Concerto-Poem (1973)
Dimiter Hristov
Cello Concerto (1970)
Tyzen Hsiao
Cello Concerto (1990)
Vitaliy Hubarenko
Cello Concerto-poem (1963)
Chamber Symphony No. 4 for cello and string orchestra (1983)
Jean Hubeau
Cello Concerto (1942)
Gregor Huebner
Cello Concerto (2008)
Bertold Hummel
 Poem for Cello and Strings, Op. 80 (1984)()
Johann Nepomuk Hummel
Grand Potpourri
Karel Husa
Cello Concerto (1988)
Lajos Huszár
Chamber concerto for cello and 17 strings (1987)
Ketil Hvoslef
Cello Concerto No.1 (1976)
Cello Concerto No.2 (1991)

I
Federico Ibarra Groth
Cello Concerto (1989)
Jacques Ibert
Concerto for Cello and Winds (1926?)
Airat Ichmouratov
Concerto for Cello No.1 with String Orchestra and percussion Op.18 (2009)
Capriccio Rustico for Cello and Orchestra Op.26  (2010)
 The Ride of Cello Vello Buffon for Cello with Orchestra Op.27 (2010) 
 Concerto for Cello No.2 with Symphony Orchestra and percussion Op.57 (2018)
Shin'ichirō Ikebe
Cello Concerto Almost a tree (1996)
Călin Ioachimescu
Cello Concerto (2002)
Martun Israelyan
Concerto for Cello and 16 Strings (1983)
Georgi Ivanov
Cello Concerto (1977)
Jānis Ivanovs
Concerto for Cello and Orchestra in B minor (1938)

J
Giuseppe Maria Jacchini 
10 "Concerti per camera [...] con violoncello obligato" Op. 4
Frederick Jacobi
Cello Concerto (Three Psalms) for Cello and Orchestra (1932)
Marie Jaëll
Cello Concerto in F (1882)
Jean-Baptiste Janson
Six Concertos pour le violoncelle à grand orchestre Op. 6 (1780)
Six Nouveaux Concertos à grand orchestre pour le violoncelle Op.15 (1799)
Michael Jarrell
Emergences - Nachlese VI (2011)
Assonance V (chaque jour n'est qu'une trêve...) (1990)
John Jeffreys
Cello Concerto (destroyed by the composer)
Wilhelm Jeral
Cello Concerto (published 1906)
Ivan Jevtić
Cello Concerto (1982)
Cello Symphony (1995)
Erkki Jokinen 
Cello Concerto (1970)
Betsy Jolas
Wanderlied, for cello and ensemble (2003)
Side Roads, for cello and String Orchestra (2017)
André Jolivet
Cello Concerto No. 1 (1962)
Cello Concerto No. 2 (1967)
Daniel Jones
Cello Concerto (1986)
Samuel Jones
Cello Concerto (2010)
Joseph Jongen
 Concerto for Cello, Op. 17 (1900)
Sverre Jordan
Cello Concerto (1947)
John Joubert
Cello Concerto Op. 171 (2011)
René Jullien
Cello Concerto (1913)
Paul Juon
 Mysterien for Cello and Orchestra, Op. 59 (1928) 
Šimon Jurovský
Cello Concerto (1953)

K
Dmitry Kabalevsky
Cello Concerto No. 1 in G minor, Op. 49 (1948–49)
Cello Concerto No. 2 in C minor, Op. 77 (1964)
Jouni Kaipainen
Cello Concerto, Op. 65 (2003)
Viktor Kalabis
Cello Concerto (1956)
Imants Kalniņš 
Cello Concerto (1963)
Romualds Kalsons
Cello Concerto (1970)
Dmitri Kaminsky
Cello Concerto (1957)
Juho Kangas
Concerto for Cello and Strings (2010)
Božidar Kantušer
Cello Concerto (1966)
Artur Kapp
Cello Concerto (1946)
Eugen Kapp 
Cello Concerto (1986)
Nikolai Kapustin
Cello Concerto No.1 (1986)
Cello Concerto No.2 (2002)
Maurice Karkoff 
Cello Concerto (1958)
Yuri Kasparov
Cello Concerto (1998)
Fritz Kauffman
Cello Concerto (published 1899)
Fredrick Kaufman
Cello Concerto (1984) Kaddish
Aaron Jay Kernis
Cello Concerto Colored Field (2000)
Air for cello and orchestra (2000)
Dreamsongs (2013)
Gordon Kerry
Concerto for cello, strings and percussion (1996)
Rudolf Kelterborn
Cello Concerto (1999)
Aram Khachaturian
Cello Concerto in E minor (1946)
Concerto-Rhapsody in D minor (1963)
Karen Khachaturian
Cello Concerto (1983)
Viktor Khodyashev
Cello Concerto (1963)
Alexander Kholminov 
Concerto for cello and chamber choir (1980)
Concerto for cello, brass quintet and timpani (1992)
Concerto for cello and chamber orchestra (1995)
Tikhon Khrennikov
Cello Concerto No. 1 in C, Op. 16 (1964)
Cello Concerto No. 2, Op. 30 (1985)
Oleg Khromushin
Cello Concerto (1980)
Adam Khudoyan
Cello Concerto No.1 (1959)
Cello Concerto No.2 (1973)
Cello Concerto No.3 (1990)
John Kinsella
Cello Concerto (2000)
Leon Kirchner
 Music for Cello and Orchestra (1992)
Uuno Klami
Cheremissian Fantasy Op. 19 (1931)
Tema con 7 variazioni e coda (1954)
Dmitri Klebanov
Cello Concerto No.1 (1950)
Cello Concerto No.2 (1973)
 Giselher Klebe
Concerto for Cello and Orchestra, Op. 29 (1958)
 George Kleinsinger
Concerto for Cello and Orchestra (1965)
Julius Klengel
Cello Concerto No. 1, Op. 4 (1880)
Cello Concerto No. 2, Op. 20 (1887)
Cello Concerto No. 3 in A minor, Op. 31 (1895)
Cello Concerto No. 4, Op. 37 (1903)
Abelis Klenickis
Concerto-Poem for Cello and Orchestra (1962)
August Klughardt
Cello Concerto in A minor, Op. 59 (1894)
Vytautas Klova
Cello Concerto No.1 (1963)
Cello Concerto No.2 (1973)
Douglas Knehans
Cello Concerto No.1 Soar (2004)
Cello Concerto No.2 Black City (2015)
Lev Knipper
Concerto-Monologue for cello, seven brass instruments and timpani (1962)
Cello Concerto No. 1 (1962)
Saga for cello, chorus and orchestra (1963)
Concerto-Poem for cello and chamber orchestra (1971)
Cello Concerto No. 2 (1972)
Erland von Koch 
Cello Concerto (1951)
Jesper Koch
Cello Concerto Dreamscapes (2007)
Raoul Koczalski 
Cello Concerto (1915)
Joonas Kokkonen
Cello Concerto (1969)
Benedykt Konowalski 
Concerto for cello and string orchestra (1996)
Marek Kopelent
Musique Concertante, for violoncello, 12 violoncelli and orchestra (1991)
Anders Koppel
Cello Concerto (2006)
Herman David Koppel
Cello Concerto, Op. 56 (1952)
Grigoriy Korchmar
Cello Concerto (1976)
Nikolai Korndorf 
Concerto capriccioso for cello and percussion (1986)
Erich Wolfgang Korngold
Cello Concerto, Op. 37 (from the movie Deception) (1946)
Paavo Korpijaakko
Cello Concerto Ankarat Valovedet (2011)
Olli Kortekangas
Cello Concerto with Horn Obligato (2000)
Irena Kosíková
7 Candles for cello and orchestra (2006)
MAKANNA for cello, voice and orchestra (2010)
Olli Koskelin
Cello Concerto 1912/18
Pekka Kostiainen
Cello Concerto (1979)
Nina Kotova
 Cello Concerto for cello and orchestra (2000)
 Cello Concerto "The Tuscan" for cello and string orchestra  (2005)
Julius Kowalski
Concerto for cello and string orchestra (1970)
Hans Kox
Cello Concerto No. 1 (1969 rev.1981)
Cello Concerto No. 2 (1997) An Odyssey
 Antonín Kraft
 Cello Concerto in C major, Op. 4
 Mirko Krajči
 Cello Concerto (2001)
Ernst Krenek
Cello Concerto No. 1, Op. 133 (1953)
Capriccio for cello and orchestra, Op. 145 (1955)
Cello Concerto No. 2, Op. 236 (1982)
Johann Jacob Kriegk
Cello Concerto Op.2
Cello Concerto Op.3
Cello Concerto Op.4
Rudolf Kubín
Cello Concerto (1960)
Gary Kulesha
Cello Concerto (2006)
Meyer Kupferman
Concerto for cello and jazz band (1962)
Jeren Kurbanklycheva
Cello Concerto (1979)

L
Ilari Laakso
AM - Concerto for Cello and Orchestra (1992)
Ezra Laderman
Concerto for cello and orchestra (1984)
Concerto for cello and orchestra (1986)
Variations on a Passacaglia for Cello solo and Large Orchestra (20 min) (1994)
Édouard Lalo
Cello Concerto in D minor (1876)
Marcel Landowski 
Cello Concerto (1945)
Poème Concertante for cello and orchestra Un Chant (1996)
Daniël de Lange
Cello Concerto
Domenico Lanzetti
Cello Concerto in D
Cello Concerto in E
Cello Concerto in F
Cello Concerto in G
Lars-Erik Larsson
Cello Concerto (1947)
Concertino for Cello and String Orchestra (1956)
Mats Larson Gothe
Concerto for Cello and Winds (1999)
Mario Lavista
Concerto
Henri Lazarof
Cello Concerto No.1 (1968)
Cello Concerto No.2 (1992)
Roman Ledenov
Concerto-elegy for cello and orchestra (1980)
Claude Ledoux
Torrent – for cello and chamber orchestra (1995)
Kenneth Leighton
Concerto for Cello and Orchestra, Op. 31
Michel Legrand
Cello Concerto (2012)
René Leibowitz
Cello Concerto (1962)
Albert Leman
Cello Concerto (1967)
Leonardo Leo
6 Cello Concertos (D major (1737), F minor (undated), A major (1738), D minor (1738), A major (1737) and Sinfonia Concertata for violoncello and strings in C minor (1737)
Fred Lerdahl
Arches (2011) – for solo cello and large chamber ensemble
Yuri Levitin
Concertino for cello and orchestra (1961)
Suite for cello and orchestra (1966)
Ernst Lévy
Cello Concerto (1947)
Frank Ezra Levy
Cello Concerto No.1 (1995)
Cello Concerto No.2 (2003)
Cello Concerto No.3 (2014)
Ulrich Leyendecker
Cello Concerto (1983)
Peter Lieberson
 "The Six Realms" for cello and orchestra (2000)
György Ligeti
Cello Concerto, for Siegfried Palm
Magnus Lindberg
Cello Concerto No. 1 (1999)
Cello Concerto No. 2 (2013)
Bo Linde
Concerto for cello and orchestra, Op. 29
August Lindner
Cello Concerto in E minor (first published 1860)
Larry Lipkis 
Cello Concerto Scaramouche (1989)
Vassily Lobanov
Cello Concerto (1985)
Fernando Lopes-Graça
Concerto da Camera col Violoncello Obbligato (1966)
Bent Lorentzen
Cello Concerto (1984)
Raymond Loucheur
Cello Concerto (1968)
Jean Louël
Cello Concerto (1986)
Leighton Lucas
Cello Concerto (or Concertino 1956)
Štěpán Lucký
Cello Concerto (1946)
David Ludwig
Concerto for Cello and Orchestra (2004)
Zdeněk Lukáš
Cello Concerto No.1 (1957)
Cello Concerto No.2 (1986)
Cello Concerto No.3 Ricordi (2005)
Witold Lutosławski
Cello Concerto (1969/70 or 1970)

M
Lorin Maazel
Music for Violoncello and Orchestra (Op. 10)
Aleksandre Machavariani
Cello Concerto (1987)
James MacMillan
Cello Concerto (premiered 1996)
Elizabeth Maconchy
Epyllion for cello and string orchestra (1975)
Jan Maegaard
Cello Concerto (1993)
Miłosz Magin
Concerto for cello, string orchestra and timpani (1977)
Giuseppe de Majo
Cello Concerto in F
Arvydas Malcys
Cello Concerto (2009)
Ivo Malec
Arc-en-Cello (2003)
Gian Francesco Malipiero
Cello Concerto (1937)
Riccardo Malipiero Junior
Cello Concerto No.1 (1938)
Cello Concerto No.2 (1957)
Alexander Manevich
Cello Concerto No.1 (1929)
Cello Concerto No.2 (1945)
Cello Concerto No.3 (1950)
Philippe Manoury
Bref Aperçu sur l'Infini for Cello and Orchestra (2015)
Tigran Mansurian
Concerto No.1 for cello and large orchestra To the Memory of Dmitry Shostakovich (1976)
Concerto No.2 for cello and strings (1978)
Concerto No.3 for cello and small orchestra (1983)
Concerto No.4 for cello and small orchestra Ubi est Abel frater tuus? (2010)
Bruno Mantovani
Concerto pour violoncelle et Orchestre (2003)
Franco Margola
Violoncello Concerto, Op. 91 (1949)
Henri Marteau
Cello Concerto in B♭ major (1905)
Frank Martin
Ballade, for cello and orchestra
Cello Concerto (1965-6)
Jean Martinon
Cello Concerto (1963)
Rolf Martinsson
Cello Concerto (2005)
Bohuslav Martinů
Cello Concerto 1 (1930, rev. 1939, rev. 1959)
Cello Concerto 2 (1944–45)
Concertino (1934)
Sonata or concerto da camera (1940)
Tauno Marttinen
Cello Concerto Dalai Lama (1966)
Martin Matalon
Trame III (2000)
Josef Matěj
Cello Concerto (1972)
Teizo Matsumura
Cello Concerto (1984)
Ville Matvejeff 
Cello Concerto Crossroads (2009)
Colin Matthews
Cello Concerto 1 (1983–84)
Cello Concerto 2 (1996)
Berceuse for Dresden
David Matthews
Romanza for cello and orchestra, Op. 49 (1990)
Concerto in Azzurro for cello and orchestra, Op. 87 (2001–02)
Berceuse (2007)
Siegfried Matthus
Cello Concerto (1975)
Nicholas Maw
Sonata Notturna for cello and string orchestra (1985)
John McCabe
Cello Concerto Songline (2007)
Tilo Medek
Cello Concerto (1978)
Janis Medinš
Cello Concerto No.1 (1928)
Cello Concerto No.2 (1947)
Johan de Meij
Casanova for solo cello and wind orchestra (2000)
Alfred Mendelsohn
Cello Concerto No.1 (1950)
Cello Concerto No.2 (1962)
Arnold Mendelssohn
Student Concerto in D major for Cello and Orchestra, Op. 213
Peter Mennin
Concerto for Cello and Orchestra (1956)
Gian Carlo Menotti 
Fantasia for cello and orchestra (1976)
Aarre Merikanto
Konzerstück (1926)
Cello Concerto 2 (1941–44)
Usko Meriläinen
Cello Concerto (1974)
John Metcalf
Cello Symphony (2004)
Krzysztof Meyer
Cello Concerto No.1 (1984) for cello and small orchestra (Concerto da camera No.3) Canti Amadei
Cello Concerto No.2 (1995)
András Mihály
Cello Concerto (1953)
Marko Mihevc
Cello Concerto (2009)
Darius Milhaud
Cello Concerto 1 (1935)
Cello Concerto 2 (1945)
Suite cisalpine (1954)
Richard Mills
Cello Concerto (1990)
Mark Minkov
Cello Concerto (1969)
Ernest John Moeran
 Cello Concerto in B minor (1945)
Roberto Molinelli
Twin Legends for cello and strings (2005)
Bernhard Molique
Cello Concerto in D (published 1854)
Johann Melchior Molter
Cello concerto (c.1730s) Little Karlsruhe Margrave-Concerto.
Georg Matthias Monn
 Cello Concerto in D major—arranged by Arnold Schoenberg from a harpsichord concerto (1746)
 Cello Concerto, G minor
Emánuel Moór
Cello Concerto (1906)
Double Cello Concerto (1908)
Oskar Morawetz
Memorial to Dr. Martin Luther King, Jr. (1968) for solo cello, winds, brass, percussion and harp (no strings; Commissioned by Mstislav Rostropovich; premiered in 1975 by Zara Nelsova and the Montreal Symphony Orchestra, Otto-Werner Mueller, cond.)
Norbert Moret
Cello Concerto (1985)
David Morgan
Cello Concerto (1981)
Stanisław Moryto
Cello Concerto (1992)
Alexander Mosolov
 Cello Concerto No. 1 (1935) (lost)
 Cello Concerto No. 2 in C minor (1946)
Piotr Moss
Cello Concerto No.1 (1975)
Cello Concerto No.2 Prieres (2003)
Jon Mostad
Cello Concerto (1990)
Wolfgang Amadeus Mozart
 Sinfonia Concertante for Violin, Viola, Cello and Orchestra
 Cello Concerto (lost)
Nico Muhly
 Cello Concerto (2012) 
Nico Muhly, Sven Helbig and Zhou Long (multi-composer work)
Cello Concerto Three Continents (2019)
Paul Müller-Zürich
Cello Concerto (1954)
Kelly-Marie Murphy
This is the colour of my dreams for cello and orchestra (1997)
Nikolai Myaskovsky
Cello Concerto in C minor, Op. 66 (1944)
Paweł Mykietyn
Cello Concerto No.1 (1998)
Cello Concerto No.2 (2019)
Josef Mysliveček
Cello Concertos in C, F, D

N
Sulkhan Nasidze
Cello Concerto (1974)
Marc Neikrug
Concerto for cello and Orchestra (2011)
Franz Xaver Neruda
 five cello concertos (No. 1 in E minor, Op. 57; No. 2 in D minor, Op. 59; No. 3 in A, Op. 60; No. 4 in A minor, Op. 61 (1887); No. 5 in G, Op. 66) ( and contain this information.)
Jon Øivind Ness
Cello Concerto Wet Blubber Soup (2002)
Dimitri Nicolau
Concerto for cello and chamber orchestra (1990)
Chan Ka Nin
 Soulmate, for cello and orchestra
Akira Nishimura
Cello Concerto (1990)
August Nölck
Cello Concerto in D minor Op.108
Cello Concerto in A minor in Op.130a (1912)
Jón Nordal 
Cello Concerto (1983)
Frank Nordensten
Cello Concerto No.1 (1996)
Anders Nordentoft
Cello Concerto Light Imprisoned (1998)
Pehr Henrik Nordgren
Cello Concerto No. 1, Op. 50 (1980)
Cello Concerto No. 2, Op. 62 (1984)
Hate-Love for cello and string orchestra, Op. 71 (1987)
Cello Concerto No. 3, Op. 82 (1992)
Cello Concerto No. 4, Op. 89 (1994)
Arne Nordheim
Concerto for Cello and Chamber Orchestra Tenebrae (1982)
Per Nørgård
Between - Cello Concerto 1 (1985)
Remembering a Child (1987)
Momentum - Cello Concerto 2 (2009)
Ib Nørholm
Cello Concerto (1989)
Mikhail Nosyrev
Cello Concerto (1973)
Milan Novák
Cello Concerto (1978)
Michael Nyman
 A New Pavan for These Sad, Distracted Times (2009)
Gösta Nystroem
 Sinfonia Concertante (1945)

O
Aleksandar Obradović
Cello Concerto (1979)
Andrej Očenáš 
Cello Concerto No.1 (1952)
Cello Concerto No.2 (1977)
Jacques Offenbach
 Grande Concerto in G major (Concerto Militaire) (1847)
Maurice Ohana
L'anneau de Tamarit for cello and orchestra (1976)
Cello Concerto "In Dark and Blue" (1989–1990)
Hisato Ohzawa
Urashima for cello and orchestra
Buxton Orr
 A Carmen Fantasy (1990) for cello and orchestra
Léon Orthel
Cello Concerto No.1 Aan mijn Ouders (1929)
Cello Concerto No.2 (1984)
Nigel Osborne
Cello Concerto (1977)

P
Luis de Pablo
Cello Concerto Frondoso Misterio (2002)
Tadeusz Paciorkiewicz
Concerto for cello and chamber ensemble (1991)
Vaclovas Paketūras
Cello Concerto (1966)
Josef Páleníček
Cello Concerto (1973)
Andrzej Panufnik
Cello Concerto (1991, premiered 1992)
Arvo Pärt
 Cello Concerto
Claude Pascal
Cello Concerto (1959)
Paul Patterson
Cello Concerto (2002)
Gustaf Paulson
Cello Concerto No.1 (1944)
Cello Concerto No.2 (1957)
Stephen Paxton
Cello Concerto in G
Russell Peck
Voice of the Wood, concerto for cello quartet and orchestra
Michail Pekov
Cello Concerto No.1 (1975)
Cello Concerto No.2 (1982)
Josef Pembaur Senior
Cello Concerto (1910)
Krzysztof Penderecki
Sonata for cello and orchestra (1964) for Siegfried Palm
Cello Concerto No. 1 (1972)
Cello Concerto No. 2 (1982)
 Concerto Grosso No. 1 for 3 cellos and orchestra (2000)
Largo for cello and orchestra (2003)
Moses Pergament
Cello Concerto (1955)
Piotr Perkowski
Cello Concerto (1973-4)
George Perle 
Cello Concerto (1966)
Jean Perrin
Cello Concerto (1972)
William Perry
Jamestown Concerto for Cello and Orchestra (2007)
Laurent Petitgirard
Cello Concerto (1994)
Carmen Petra-Basacopol 
Cello Concerto (1982)
Petros Petridis 
Cello Concerto (1936)
Hans Pfitzner
 Cello Concerto No. 1 in G major, Op. 42 (1935)
 Cello Concerto No. 2 in A minor, Op. 52 (1943)
 Cello Concerto in A minor, Op. posth.(1888)
Carlo Alfredo Piatti
 Concertino, Op. 18 (1863?)
 Cello Concerto No. 1 in B flat major, Op. 24 (1874)
 Cello Concerto No. 2 in D minor, Op. 26 (1877)
Tobias Picker
Cello Concerto (1999)
Willem Pijper
Cello Concerto (1936 rev.1947)
Edward Joshua Pimentel Ojeda
Cello Concerto No.1 (2019)
Cello Concerto No.2 (2019)
Matthias Pintscher
La Metamorfosi di Narciso for cello and ensemble (1992)
Reflections on Narcissus for cello and orchestra (2005)
Un despertar (2016)
Lubomir Pipkov
Symphony-Concerto for cello and orchestra (1963)
Walter Piston
 Variations for Cello and Orchestra (1966)
Ildebrando Pizzetti
Cello Concerto (1934)
Nicolas-Joseph Platel
Five Cello Concertos
Giovanni Benedetto Platti
Cello Concerto in A
Cello Concerto in D minor
Cello Concerto in D
Ignaz Pleyel
 Four Cello Concertos in C major and one in D major
Erich Plüss
Cello Concerto (2015)
Petr Podkovyrov
Cello Concerto (1959)
Valeri Polyakov 
Cello Concerto (1960)
David Popper
Cello Concerto No. 1 in D minor, Op. 8, 1861
Cello Concerto No. 2 in E minor, Op. 24, 1880
Cello Concerto No. 3 in G major, Op. 59, in one movement
Cello Concerto No. 4 in B minor, Op. 72, in four movements
Cello Concerto No. 5 "in the style of Haydn"
Nicola Porpora
Cello Concerto in G major
Angelique Poteat
Cello Concerto (2019)
Gerhard Präsent
Danse fatale Op. 75 (2017–18), 10 min. 
Gabriel Prokofiev
Cello Concerto (2012)
Sergei Prokofiev
 Cello Concerto, Op. 58
 Symphony-Concerto in E minor, Op. 125 (1950–52)
 Cello Concertino in G minor, Op. 132 (one version completed by Kabalevsky, another by Blok) (1952)
Dariusz Przybylski 
Cello Concerto (2013)
Uljas Pulkkis
Madrigal (2000)
Dragonfly (2012)

R
Robin de Raaff
Cello Concerto (2013)
Jaan Rääts 
Concerto for cello and chamber orchestra Op.27 (1966)
Concerto for cello and orchestra Op.43 (1971)
Concerto for cello and orchestra Op.59 (recomposition of Op.43, 1977)
Concerto for cello and chamber orchestra Op.99 (1997)
Joachim Raff
 Cello Concerto No. 1 in D minor, Op. 193, 1874
 Cello Concerto No. 2 in G, Op. posth, 1876
Osmo Tapio Räihälä
 Cello Concerto
Priaulx Rainier
Cello Concerto (1964)
Primož Ramovš
Cello Concerto (1974)
Bernard Rands
Cello Concerto (1996)
 Behzad Ranjbaran
 Cello Concerto
 Weronika Ratusińska-Zamuszko
 Cello Concerto (2008)
 Georg Wilhelm Rauchenecker
 Cello Concerto (1904)
Einojuhani Rautavaara
 Cello Concerto No. 1 (1968)
 Cello Concerto No. 2 Towards the Horizon (2009)
 Alan Rawsthorne
 Cello Concerto
 Igor Raykhelson
 Cello Concerto (2010)
Josef Reicha
 Cello Concertos in F minor, G major and A major (and/or E major) from Op. 4
Antonín Reichenauer
Cello Concerto in D
Cello Concerto in D minor
Carl Reinecke
 Cello Concerto in D minor, Op. 82 (1864)
Karel Reiner
Cello Concerto (1943)
Jay Reise
Concerto for cello and 13 instruments (2000)
Franz Reizenstein
 Cello Concerto, Op. 8 (1951)
Antanas Rekašius
Cello Concerto Diaphony (1972)
Stefan Remenkov
Cello Concerto (1964)
Ottorino Respighi
Adagio con variazioni for Cello and Orchestra
Roger Reynolds
The Dream of the Infinite Rooms (1986)
Paul Richter
Cello Concerto Op.109
Jaroslav Rídký
Cello Concerto No.1 (1930)
Cello Concerto No.2 (1940)
Alan Ridout
Cello Concerto No. 1 for cello, percussion and strings (1984)
Cello Concerto No. 2 for cello and wordless choir (1994)
Cello Concerto No. 3 for cello and 8 cellos (1995)
Julius Rietz
Cello Concerto (1830s)
Wolfgang Rihm
Monodram for Cello and Orchestra (1982–1983)
Styx und Lethe for Cello and Orchestra (1997–1998)
Konzert in einem Satz for Cello and Orchestra (2005–2006)
Jean Rivier
Cello Concerto (1927)
Hayden Roberts
Cello Concerto (2019)
Yann Robin
 Quarks (2016)
 Joaquín Rodrigo
 Concerto in modo galante (1949)
 Concerto como un divertimento (1981)
 Bernhard Romberg
 Concerto No. 1 in B-flat Major, for cello and orchestra Op.2
 Grand Concerto No. 2 in D Major, for cello with orchestra Op.3
 Concerto No. 3 in G Major, for cello and orchestra Op.6
 Cello Concerto No.4 in E minor Op.7
 Concerto No. 5 in F-sharp Minor for cello and orchestra Op.30
 Concerto No. 6 in F Major (Militaire) for cello and orchestra Op.31
 Concerto No. 7 in C Major (Suisse) for cello and orchestra Op.44
 Concerto No. 8 in A Major (Brillant) for cello and orchestra Op.48
 Concerto No. 9 in B Minor (Grand) for cello and orchestra Op.56
 Concerto No. 10 in E Major (Brillant), for cello and orchestra Op.75
 Alfonso Romero Asenjo
 Cello Concerto (1995)
Julius Röntgen
 Cello Concerto No. 1 in E minor (1893/1894)
 Cello Concerto No. 2 in G minor (1909)
 Cello Concerto No. 3 in F-sharp minor (1928)
Joseph-Guy Ropartz
Rhapsodie pour violoncelle et orchestre (1928)
Ned Rorem
Cello Concerto (2002)
Hilding Rosenberg
 Cello Concerto No. 1 (1939)
 Cello Concerto No. 2 (1953)
Helmut Rosenvald 
Concerto for cello and chamber orchestra (1970)
Chamber symphony No.2 (for cello and chamber orchestra, 1979)
Nino Rota
 Cello Concerto No. 0 (1925) Premiered by Orfeo Mandozzi (2005)
 Cello Concerto No. 1 (1972)
 Cello Concerto No. 2 (1973)
Doina Rotaru
Cello Concerto (1987)
Christopher Rouse
Violoncello Concerto (1993)
Albert Roussel
 Cello Concertino (1936)
Francis Routh
Cello Concerto (1973)
Miklós Rózsa
 Cello concerto, Op. 32 (1968)
Edmund Rubbra
Soliloquy for cello, horns strings and timpani, Op. 57 (1947)
Anton Rubinstein
 Cello Concerto in A minor, Op. 65 (1864)
 Cello Concerto in D minor, Op. 96 (1875)
Poul Ruders
Polydrama - Cello Concerto 1 (1988)
Anima - Cello Concerto 2 (1993)

S
Kaija Saariaho
 Amers, for cello and ensemble (1992)
 Cello Concerto Notes on Light (2006)
Nicola Sabatino
Cello Concerto in G
Harald Sæverud
Cello Concerto (1931)
Dimitar Sagaev
Cello Concerto No.1 (1977)
Cello Concerto No.2 (1998)
Camille Saint-Saëns
 Cello Concerto No. 1 in A minor, Op. 33 (1872)
 Cello Concerto No. 2 in D minor, Op. 119 (1902)
Allegro appassionato in B minor, Op. 43
Romance, Op. 36
Suite in D minor, Op. 16 bis for cello and orchestra
Aulis Sallinen
 Cello Concerto, Op. 44 (1976)
 Nocturnal Dances of Don Juan Quixote for Cello and String Orchestra, Op. 58
Erkki Salmenhaara
Poema for cello and orchestra (1975)
Cello Concerto (1987)
Siegfried Salomon
Cello Concerto (1922)
Esa-Pekka Salonen
"Mania" for cello and ensemble (or orchestra) (2000)
Cello Concerto (2017)
Tadeás Salva
Concerto for cello and chamber orchestra (1967)
Sven-David Sandström
Cello Concerto (1988)
Federico Maria Sardelli
Cello Concerto in G minor (2008)
Cello Concerto in C minor (2018)
Ruben Sargsyan
Concerto No.1 for Cello and Symphonic orchestra, 1977
Concerto No.2 for Cello and Chamber orchestra, 1979
Concerto No.3 for Cello and Chamber orchestra, 1989
Concerto No.4 for Cello and Chamber orchestra, 1994
Cogitation for Cello and Chamber orchestra, 2000
Philip Sawyers
Cello Concerto (2010)
Robert Saxton
 Cello Concerto (1993)
Fazıl Say
Cello Concerto Never give up (2018)
Ahmet Adnan Saygun
 Cello Concerto, Op. 74 (1987)
Giacinto Scelsi
 Cello Concerto
Harold Schiffman
Cello Concerto (1997)
Heather Schmidt
Cello Concerto (1998)
Ole Schmidt 
Cello Concerto (2005)
Thomas Schmidt-Kowalski 
Cello Concerto (2002)
Florent Schmitt
Introït, Récit et Congé for cello and orchestra (1948) 
Albert Schnelzer
Crazy Diamond - Cello concerto (2011)
Alfred Schnittke
 Cello Concerto No. 1 (1986)
 Cello Concerto No. 2 (1989–90)
Daniel Schnyder
 Concerto for Violoncello and Orchestra
Othmar Schoeck
 Cello concerto in A minor, Op. 61 (1947)
Philippe Schoeller
 The Eyes of the Wind (2005)
Arnold Schoenberg
 Cello Concerto in D major (1932/33), freely transcribed from Monn's Clavicembalo Concerto in D major
Peter Schuback
Cello Concerto (1973)
Carl Schuberth
Cello Concerto No.1 (published 1841)
William Schuman
 A Song of Orpheus for Cello and Orchestra (1962)
Robert Schumann
Cello Concerto in A minor, Op. 129 (1850)
Gerard Schurmann
The Gardens of Exile for cello and orchestra (1991)
Ary Schuyer
Cello concerto (1913)
 Laura Schwendinger
 Esprimere Concerto for cello and orchestra (2005)
Salvatore Sciarrino
Linee d'aria (2022)
Variazioni (1974)
Cyril Scott
 Cello Concerto [No. 1], Op. 19 (1902)
 Cello Concerto [No. 2] (1937)
Leif Segerstam
8 Cello Concertos
Mátyás Seiber
Tre Pezzi for cello and orchestra (1956)
Anatolijus Šenderovas
Concerto for Cello and String Orchestra (1964)
Cello Concerto in C (2002)
Cello Concerto No.3 (2012)
Adrien-François Servais (1807-1866)
Cello Concerto in B minor Op.5 (1847)
Morceau de concert Op.14 (deuxieme Concerto)
Concerto Militaire Op.18 
Zdeněk Šesták
Cello Concerto No.1 Light of Hope (2002)
Cello Concerto No.2 The Path of Knowledge (2005)
Tolib Shakhidi 
Cello Concerto No.1 Concert Raga (1989)
Cello Concerto No.2 (2003)
Vache Sharafyan
Cello Concerto No.1 (2004) 
Suite for cello and orchestra (2009)
Cello Concerto No.2 (2013) 
Rodion Shchedrin
 Cello Concerto opus 87 "Sotto Voce" (1994)
Parabola Concertante for cello, string orchestra and timpani (2001)
Alexander Shchetynsky
 Cello Concerto (1982)
Noam Sheriff
Cello Concerto (1987)
Percy Sherwood
Cello Concerto No.1 (1890 rev.1893)
Cello Concerto No.2 (1902)
Howard Shore
Mythic Gardens (2012)
Dmitri Shostakovich
 Cello Concerto No. 1 in E-flat, Op. 107 (1959)
 Cello Concerto No. 2 in G, Op. 126  (1966)
 Alan Shulman
 Cello Concerto (1948)
 Thorkell Sigurbjörnsson
 Cello Concerto Ulisse Ritorna (1981)
 Valentin Silvestrov
 Meditation Symphony for cello and chamber orchestra (1972)
 Pavol Šimai
 Cello Concerto (1986)
 Daniel Léo Simpson
 Cello Concerto (1996)
 Robert Simpson
 Cello Concerto (1991)
 Hans Sitt
 Concerto No. 1 in A minor for cello and orchestra, Op. 34 (1890)
 Concerto No. 2 in D minor for cello and orchestra, Op. 38 (1891)
Nikos Skalkottas
 Cello Concerto – lost (1938)
Lucijan Marija Skerjanc
 Allegro de Concert (1947)
Yngve Sköld
Cello Concerto (1947)
Myroslav Skoryk
Cello Concerto (1983)
Sergei Slonimsky
Concerto for cello and chamber orchestra (1998)
Roger Smalley
Concerto for cello and 17 players (1996)
Dmitri Smirnov
Cello Concerto (1992)
Tatiana Smirnova
Concerto-Symphony for cello and chamber orchestra (1987)
Leo Smit
Concertino (1937)
Dmitry Smolsky 
Cello Concerto (1973)
Črt Sojar-Voglar
Cello Concerto (2002)
Giovanni Sollima
Cello Concerto (1992)
Vladimir Soltan
Cello Concerto (1987)
Vladimír Sommer
Cello Concerto (1979)
József Soproni 
Cello Concerto No.1 (1967)
Cello Concerto No.2 (1984)
Vladimír Soukup
Cello Concerto (1972)
Leo Sowerby
Cello Concerto in A major (1914–16)
 Cello Concerto in E minor (1929–1934)
Ivan Spassov
Cello Concerto No.1 (1974)
Cello Concerto No.2 (1984)
Marek Stachowski 
Concerto for cello and string orchestra (1988)
Recitativo e la preghiera (1999)
Adagio ricordamente (1999)
Julius Stahlknecht 
Cello Concerto (published 1867)
Carl Stamitz
Cello Concerto No. 1 in G major
Cello Concerto No. 2 in A major
Cello Concerto No. 3 in C major
Cello Concerto No. 4 in C (from )
Patric Standford
Cello Concerto (1974)
Charles Villiers Stanford
Cello Concerto in D minor (1879/1880)
Irish Rhapsody No.3 (1913)
Robert Starer
Cello Concerto (1988)
Johannes Maria Staud
Segue (2006)
Allan Stephenson
Cello Concerto (2004)
Roger Steptoe
Cello Concerto (1991)
Bernard Stevens
Cello Concerto (1952)
Ronald Stevenson
 Cello Concerto (1998) The Solitary Singer
Veselin Stoyanov
Cello Concerto (1960)
Todor Stoykov
Cello Concerto (1982)
Gerald Strang
Concerto for cello with woodwinds and piano (1951)
Johann Strauss
Romance No.1 Op. 243
Romance No.2 Op. 255
Richard Strauss
Romanze
Don Quixote
Franz Strigl
Cello Concerto (1890s)
Marco Stroppa
And one by one we drop away (2006)
Steven Stucky
Voyages for Cello and Wind Ensemble (1984)
Stjepan Šulek 
Cello Concerto (1949)
Arthur Sullivan
 Cello Concerto in D (reconstruction) (1866)
Lepo Sumera
Cello Concerto (1998/1999)
Johan Svendsen
 Cello Concerto in D major, Op. 7 (1870)
Jules de Swert
Cello Concerto No.1 (1874)
Cello Concerto No.2 (1878)
Harald Sæverud
 Cello Concerto, Op. 7 (1931)

T
Emil Tabakov
Cello Concerto (2006)
Tan Dun
Elegy: Snow in June, for cello and percussion (1991)
Yi1: Intercourse of Fire and Water, (1994)
Heaven Earth Mankind: Symphony 1997 (1997)
Crouching Tiger Concerto, for cello and chamber orchestra (2000)
The Map: Concerto for Cello, Video and Orchestra (2002)
Toru Takemitsu
Scene, for cello and strings
Orion and Pleiades, for cello and Orchestra
Otar Taktakishvili
Cello Concerto No.1 (1947)
Cello Concerto No.2 (1977)
Josef Tal
Concerto for violoncello & string orchestra (1960)
Double Concerto for violin, cello & chamber orchestra (1969)
Eino Tamberg
Cello Concerto (2001)
Karen Tanaka
Urban Prayer (2004)
Eric Tanguy
 Concerto 1 (1995)
 Concerto 2 (2000)
 In terra pace (2007)
Alexandre Tansman
 Cello Concerto (1964)
Andrea Tarrodi 
Cello Concerto Highlands (2013)
Giuseppe Tartini
 Cello Concerto in D
 Cello Concerto in A
John Tavener
The Protecting Veil for cello and String Orchestra (1988)
Alexander Tchaikovsky
Cello concerto 6 Variations and a theme (1974)
Boris Tchaikovsky
 Cello Concerto in E (1964)
Pyotr Ilyich Tchaikovsky
Variations on a Rococo Theme, Op. 33, 1876, rev. 1878
Pezzo Capriccioso, Op. 62
 Nocturne, Op. 19, No. 4
 Andente Cantabile, Op. 11 (from String Quartet No. 1)
Cello Concerto in B minor (1893, unfinished), completed by Yuriy Leonovich in 2006
Ede Terényi
Concerto for cello and chamber orchestra Rapsodia Baroca (1984)
Yuri Ter-Osipov 
Cello Concerto No.1 (1969)
Cello Concerto No.2 (1982)
Alexander Tcherepnin
Georgian Rhapsody for Cello and orchestra, Op. 25 (1922)
Mystère for Cello and Chamber Orchestra, Op. 37/2 (1925)
Ferdinand Thieriot
Cello Concerto No.1 (published 1915)
Augusta Read Thomas
Cello Concerto No. 1 – Vigil (1990)
Cello Concerto No. 2 – Ritual Incantations (1999)
Cello Concerto No. 3 – Legend of the Phoenix (2012)
Olav Anton Thommessen
Miniature concerto for cello and two woodwind quintets Phantom of Light (1990)
Virgil Thomson
Cello Concerto (1949)
Lasse Thoresen
Passage through three Valleys Op. 38 (2008)
Leif Thybo
Cello Concerto (1959)
Vladimír Tichý
Cello Concerto (1977)
Jukka Tiensuu
"Oire" Cello Concerto (2014)
Tarinaoopperabaletti, Concerto for Electric cello and orchestra (2016)
Luís Tinoco
Cello Concerto (2016-7)
 Boris Tishchenko
 Cello Concerto No. 1, for solo cello, 17 wind instruments, percussion, and harmonium (1963) (Also orchestrated by Dmitri Shostakovich in 1969)
 Cello Concerto No. 2, for solo cello, 48 cellos, 12 double-basses, and percussion (1969, arranged for orchestra in 1979)
Antoine Tisné
Cello Concerto (1965)
Juro Tkalčić
Cello Concerto (1922)
Ernst Toch
Cello Concerto, Op. 35 (1924)
Henri Tomasi
Cello Concerto (1970)
Eugenio Toussaint
Cello Concerto No.1 (1982)
Cello Concerto No.2 (1999)
Donald Tovey
Cello Concerto in C major, Op. 40 (1933)
Yuzo Toyama
Cello Concerto (1967)
Jean Balthasar Tricklir
13 cello concertos
Vitomir Trifunović 
Cello Concerto (1991)
Sulkhan Tsintsadze
 Cello Concerto No. 2 (1966)
 Cello Concerto No. 3 (1973)
 Concertino for cello and orchestra (1976) (30 min)
Vladimir Tsytovich
Cello Concerto (1981)
Mark-Anthony Turnage
Kai, for cello and ensemble (1990)
Cello Concerto (2010)
Kalervo Tuukkanen
Cello Concerto (1946)
Erkki-Sven Tüür
Cello Concerto (1996)
Romuald Twardowski
Cello Concerto (1997)

U

 Owen Underhill
 Cello Concerto (2016)

V
Moisei Vainberg see Mieczysław Weinberg
Johann Baptist Vanhal see Johann Baptist Wanhal
Sergei Vasilenko 
Cello Concerto (1944)
Pēteris Vasks
Cello Concerto (1993–1994)
 Cello Concerto No. 2 Klātbūtne (Presence) for cello and string orchestra (2012)
Marc Vaubourgoin 
Cello Concerto (1932)
Anatol Vieru
Cello concerto (1962)
Sinfonia Concertante (1987)
Henri Vieuxtemps
 Cello Concerto in A minor, Op. posth. 46 (1877)
 Cello Concerto in B minor, Op. posth. 50 (1884)
Heitor Villa-Lobos (1887–1959)
Grande Concerto for Cello and Orchestra No. 1, Op. 50 (1915)
Fantasia for Cello and Orchestra, W. 454 (1945)
Cello Concerto No. 2, W. 516 (1953)
Jesús Villa-Rojo
Concierto 2 for cello and orchestra (1983)
Carl Vine
Cello Concerto (2004)
Olli Virtaperko
Concerto for Amplified Cello Romer's Gap (2016)
János Viski
Cello Concerto (1955)
Antonio Vivaldi
RV 398 in C
RV 399 in C
RV 400 in C
RV 401 in C minor
RV 402 in C minor
RV 403 in D
RV 404 in D
RV 405 in D minor
RV 406 in D minor (related to RV 481)
RV 407 in D minor
RV 408 in E-flat
RV 410 in F
RV 411 in F
RV 412 in F
RV 413 in G
RV 414 in G
RV 415 in G
RV 416 in G minor
RV 417 in G minor
RV 418 in A minor
RV 419 in A minor
RV 420 in A minor
RV 421 in A minor
RV 422 in A minor
RV 423 in B-flat
RV 424 in B minor
RV 531 in G minor, for 2 cellos
Vladimir Vlasov
Cello Concerto No. 1 in C major (1963)
Cello Concerto No. 2 (1969)
Lodewijk de Vocht
Cello Concerto (1955)
Kevin Volans
Cello Concerto (1997)
Robert Volkmann
Cello Concerto in A minor, Op. 33 (1853–55) (in one movement)
Alexander Voormolen
Cello Concerto (1941)
Antonín Vranický (same as Anton Wranitzky below)
 Concerto in D minor

W
Georg Christoph Wagenseil
 concertos in C major and A major (published by Doblinger  by Fritz Racek and/or with cadenzas by Enrico Mainardi)
George Walker
Concerto for Cello and Orchestra (1981)
Dialogus for Cello and Orchestra (1976)
Movements for Cello and Orchestra (2012)
Errollyn Wallen
Concerto for cello and strings (2007)
Rolf Wallin
Ground, for cello and string orchestra (1996)
Ivor Walsworth
Cello Concerto
William Walton
Cello Concerto (1956)
Johann Baptist Wanhal (Vanhal)
Cello Concerto in A major
Cello Concerto in C
Cello Concerto in C
Graham Waterhouse
 Cello Concerto, Op. 27 (1995), also Op. 27a (2005), a version for chamber orchestra
Carl Maria von Weber
Concerto (Grand Potpourri)
Karl Weigl
Cello Concerto (1934)
Mieczysław Weinberg
 Cello Concerto in C minor, Op. 43 (1956)
Fantasy for Cello and Orchestra (1956)
Felix Weingartner
 Cello Concerto in A minor, Op. 60 (1917)
Henning Wellejus
Cello Concerto (1978)
Deqing Wen
Cello Concerto Shanghai Prelude (2015)
Svend Westergaard
Cello Concerto (1962)
Graham Whettam
 Concerto Drammatico (1998)
Charles-Marie Widor
Cello Concerto, Op. 41 (1882)
John Williams
Concerto for Cello and Orchestra (1994)
Elegy for Cello and Orchestra (1997)
Heartwood for Cello and Orchestra (2002)
Dag Wirén
 Cello Concerto (1936)
Friedrich Witt
Cello Concerto
Ermanno Wolf-Ferrari
 Cello Concerto in C, Op. 31
Julia Wolfe
Wind in my Hair (2018)
Haydn Wood
Philharmonic Variations for cello and orchestra (1939)
Hugh Wood
Cello Concerto Op. 12 (1969)
John Woolrich
 Cello Concerto (1998)
William Wordsworth
Cello Concerto (1962)
Anton Wranitzky (same as Vranický above)
 Concerto in D minor
Paul Wranitzky
 Concerto in C major, Op. 27
Charles Wuorinen
Chamber concerto for cello and ten instruments (1963)
Concerto for amplified cello and orchestra Five (1975)

X
Iannis Xenakis
Epicycles, for cello and 12 instruments

Y
Victoria Yagling
Cello Concerto No.1 (1975)
Cello Concerto No.2 (1984)
Cello Concerto No.3 - Symphony Concerto (2001)
Dmitri Yanov-Yanovsky
Cello Concerto (2010)
Akio Yashiro
Cello Concerto (1960)
Takashi Yoshimatsu
Cello Concerto (Centaurus Unit)(2003)
Yosko Yosifov 
Cello Concerto (1950)
Eugène Ysaÿe
Méditation
Serenade
Isang Yun
Concerto for Cello and Orchestra (1975/76)
Benjamin Yusupov
Cello Concerto (2007)

Z

Jan Zach
Cello Concerto
Andrea Zani
Cello Concerto No. 1 in A Major, WD 793
Cello Concerto No. 2 in A Minor, WD 789
Cello Concerto No. 3 in D Major, WD 792
Cello Concerto No. 4 in D Minor, WD 795
Cello Concerto No. 5 in G Major, WD 790
Cello Concerto No. 6 in G Minor, WD 797
Cello Concerto No. 7 in C Major, WD 788
Cello Concerto No. 8 in C Minor, WD 798
Cello Concerto No. 9 in B-Flat Major, WD 796
Cello Concerto No. 10 in F Major, WD 794
Cello Concerto No. 11 in E Minor, WD 791
Cello Concerto No. 12 in F Minor, WD 799
Pascal Zavaro
Cello Concerto No.1 (2007)
Into the wild (Cello Concerto No.2, 2016)
Erich Zeisl 
Concerto grosso for cello and orchestra (1956)
Lubomír Železný 
Cello Concerto (1968)
Ilya Zeljenka
Cello Concerto (2000)
Concerto for two cellos and string orchestra (1994)
Ferdinand Zellbell the Younger
Cello Concerto (1741)
Hans Zender
Bardo (2000)
Winfried Zillig
Concerto for Violoncello und Brass Orchestra (1934/1952), for Siegfried Palm
Efrem Zimbalist
Cello Concerto (1969)
Bernd Alois Zimmermann
Canto di Speranza (1957) for Siegfried Palm
Concerto for Cello and Orchestra en forme de pas de trois (1966), for Siegfried Palm
Alexander Znosko-Borovsky
Cello Concerto (1968)
Wim Zwaag 
Cello concerto (2003) The changing colors in time
Ellen Taaffe Zwilich
Concerto for Cello and Orchestra (2020)
Otto Zykan
Cello Concerto (1982)
Samuel Zyman
Cello Concerto (1990)

Concertos for cello and other solo instrument(s)
Kurt Atterberg
Concerto in G minor and C major for violin, violoncello and string orchestra, Op. 57 (1959–60)
Ludwig van Beethoven
Triple Concerto for violin, cello, piano and orchestra in C major, Op. 56 (1804)
Giovanni Bottesini
Double Concerto for Cello and Double Bass in G major
Johannes Brahms
 Double Concerto in A minor for Violin, Cello and Orchestra (1887)
Cesar Bresgen
Concertino, for violin, cello and small orchestra
Friedrich Cerha
Double Concerto, for Violin, Cello and Orchestra (1976)
Gordon Shi-Wen Chin
Double concerto for Violin and Cello (2006)
Paul Constantinescu
Triple concerto for piano, violin, cello and orchestra – 1964
Richard Danielpour
In the Arms of the Beloved (Double Concerto for Violin, Cello and Orchestra) (2001)
Johann Nepomuk David
Concerto for Violin, Cello and Orchestra, Op. 68 (1971)
Frederick Delius
Double Concerto for Violin, Cello and Orchestra (1915–16)
 Edison Denisov
 Concerto for bassoon, cello and orchestra (1982)
Gaetano Donizetti
Double Concerto for Violin, Cello and Orchestra in D minor
Tan Dun
Secret Land for Orchestra and Twelve Violoncellos (2004)
Wolfgang Fortner
Zyklus for Violoncello, Winds, Harp and Percussion (1970), premiered by Siegfried Palm
Geza Frid
Concertino for Violin, Cello, Piano and Orchestra, Op. 63 (11 min) (1961) Donemus
Lou Harrison
Double Concerto for Violin, Cello and Gamelan (1982)
Joseph Haydn
Sinfonia Concertante for violin, cello, oboe and bassoon
Joel Hoffman (born 1953)
Triple Concerto for Violin, Viola, Cello and Orchestra (22 min) (1978)
Double Concerto for Viola and Cello and Orchestra (31 min)
Leopold Hofmann
Concertino for two cellos and orchestra
Julius Klengel
Double Concerto No. 1 for 2 Cellos and Orchestra
Double Concerto No. 2 in E minor for 2 Cellos and Orchestra, Op. 45 (1912)
Double Concerto No. 1 for Violin, Cello and Orchestra
Double Concerto No. 2 for Violin, Cello and Orchestra, Op. 61 (1924)
Ezra Laderman
Parisot – Concerto for Multiple Cellos and orchestra (Schirmer) (27 min) (1996)
Kenneth Leighton
Suite 'Veris Gratia' for Cello, Oboe and Orchestra, Op. 9
Edgar Meyer
Double Concerto for Cello, Double Bass and Orchestra (1995) 19'
Norbert Moret
Double Concerto for Violin and Cello (1981)
 Michael Nyman
 Double concerto for Cello and Saxophone
Mark O'Connor
Double Concerto for violin, cello and orchestra (For the Heroes) – three movements
David Ott
 Concerto for Two Cellos (1988)
Krzysztof Penderecki
Concerto grosso for 3 Cellos and Orchestra (2000–01)
Hans Pfitzner
Duo for Violin, Cello and Small Orchestra (or piano)
Carlo Alfredo Piatti
"Serenata" for two cellos and orchestra
David Popper
Requiem for 3 cellos and orchestra, Op. 66
Robert Xavier Rodríguez
Favola Concertante, Ballet and Double Concerto for Violin, Cello, and String Orchestra (1975)
Julius Röntgen
Triple concerto in B-flat major, for violin, viola, cello and strings (1922)
Double Concerto for violin and cello (1927)
Triple concerto for violin, viola and cello (1930)
Introduktion, Fuge, Intermezzo und Finale for violin, viola, cello
Ned Rorem
Double Concerto for Violin, Cello and Orchestra
Miklós Rózsa
Theme and Variations for violin, cello and orchestra (This work exist in two forms)
Sinfonia Concertant, Op. 29
Tema con Variazoni, Op. 29a
Kaija Saariaho
Mirage for soprano, cello and orchestra (2007)
Camille Saint-Saëns
 La Muse et le Poète for Violin, Cello and Orchestra, Op. 132 (1910)
Alfred Schnittke
Concerto Grosso No. 2, for violin, violoncello and orchestra (1981–82)
Giovanni Sollima
Violoncelles, vibrez! (1993)
Ivan Tcherepnin
Double Concerto for Violin, Cello and Orchestra (1996)
Lasse Thoresen
Illuminations – Concerto for 2 Violoncelli and Orchestra
Michael Tippett
Triple Concerto for violin, viola, cello and orchestra (1978–79)
[Jesús Torres]]
Transfiguración. Double Concerto for Cello, Accordion and String Orchestra
Heitor Villa-Lobos
Fantasia Concertante for 16 or 32 cellos (1958)
Antonio Vivaldi
Double Concerto in E minor for Cello and Bassoon, RV 409
Double Concerto in G minor for 2 Cellos and String Orchestra
Double Concerto ("All'inglese"), for Violin, Cello, Strings & Continuo in A major, RV 546
Concerto for Violin, Cello and Strings in B-flat major, Op. 20, No. 2
Concerto for Violin, Cello and Strings in F major RV 308
Concerto for Violin, Cello and Strings in A major RV 238
Henri Vieuxtemps
Duo brilliant, for Violin, Cello and Orchestra, Op. 39
Peter von Winter
Concertino in E-flat major for clarinet, cello and orchestra Edition

Concertante works and arrangements

Sir Granville Bantock
Elegiac poem (1898)
Sapphic poem (1906)
Celtic poem  (1914)
Hamabdil for cello, harp and strings (1919) (Part of Judith)
Dramatic poem (1941)
Adolphe Biarent
Deux sonnets pour violoncelle et orchestre – d'après José-Maria de Hérédia (1909–1912)
I Le réveil d'un dieu
II Floridum Mare
Ernest Bloch
Schelomo, Rhapsodie Hebraïque pour violoncelle et grand orchestre (1915–16)
Voice in the Wilderness (1934–36)
Leon Boëllmann
Variations Symphoniques, Op. 23
York Bowen
Rhapsody for Cello and Orchestra, Op. 74
Johannes Brahms
Arrangement of the Double Concerto for Solo Cello and Orchestra
(arr. Garben; from the Concerto for Violin and Cello and Orchestra) Edition Sikorski
Frank Bridge
Oration (1930)
Max Bruch
Kol Nidre, Op. 47 (late 1880)
Canzone, Op. 55 (about 1891)
Adagio after Celtic themes, Op. 56
Ave Maria, Op. 61 (1892)
Alan Bush
Concert Suite Op. 37
Gaspar Cassadó
 Cello Concerto in E major, based on Tchaikovsky's Piano Pieces, Op. 72, (1940)
 Cello Concerto in D major, based on Carl Maria von Weber's Clarinet Concerto No. 2 in E-flat major, Op. 74
 Cello Concerto in D major, based on Mozart's Horn Concerto No. 3 in E-flat major, K. 447
 Cello Concerto in A minor, based on Schubert's Sonata for Arpeggione and Piano, D. 821
Jean Cras
Légende (1929)
César Cui
Deux morceaux Op.36 (1886)
I. Scherzando: Allegretto mosso
II. Cantabile: Andante
Frederick Delius
Caprice and Elegy (1930)
Ernő Dohnányi
Konzertstück, for cello and orchestra in D major, Op. 12 (1903–4)
Antonín Dvořák
Rondo in G minor, Op. 94, B.181 (1893)
Silent Woods, Op. 68, No. 5, B.182 (1893)
Gabriel Fauré
Élegie in C minor, Op. 24
Alexander Glazunov
A la mémoire d'un Heros, Op.8 (1885)
Deux pièces, Op.20 (1888)
I. Mélodie: Moderato
II. Sérénade espagnole: Allegretto
Chant du ménestrel, Op.71 (1900)
A la mémoire de Gogol, Op.87 (1909
 Osvaldo Golijov
 Azul for cello and orchestra (2006)
 Mariel for cello and orchestra (2007)
 Ausencia for cello and strings (2007)
Victor Herbert
5 pieces (1900)
I. Yesterthoughts
II. Pièce amoureuse
III. Puchinello
IV. Ghazel
V. The Mountainbrook
Frigyes Hidas
Fantasy for Cello and Wind Band (1998)
Paul Juon
Mysterien für Violoncello und Orchester, Op. 59, 1928
Julius Klengel
Andante sostenuto, Op. 51
Guillaume Lekeu
Larghetto for Cello and Orchestra  (1892)
Giuseppe Martucci
Andante. Op. 69.2 (1891)
Oskar Morawetz
Memorial to Dr. Martin Luther King, Jr. (1968) for solo cello, winds, brass, percussion and harp (no strings; Commissioned by Mstislav Rostropovich; premiered in 1975 by Zara Nelsova and the Montreal Symphony Orchestra, Otto-Werner Mueller, cond.)
Wolfgang Amadeus Mozart
 Concerto in D for Cello and Orchestra K. 314 (285d) transcribed by George Szell (originally for oboe / flute in C major)
 Cello Concerto in D, K. 447 (original for Horn in E-flat) (arr. Cassado)
Jacques Offenbach
Andante, A.8 (1845)
Rondo, Op. 25
Niccolò Paganini
Variations on One String
Hans Pfitzner
 Duo for Violin, Cello and small Orchestra, Op. 43 (1937)
Carlo Alfredo Piatti
"Air Baskyrs, Op. 8" for cello and string orchestra
"Entreaty / Supplication / Bitte" for cello and orchestra
(also a version for cello and strings, also a version for cello and quartet)
"Tema e Variazioni" for cello and string orchestra
Walter Piston
Variations for cello and orchestra (1966)
David Popper
Im Walde Suite
Gavotte No. 2 in D minor
Tarantella
Hungarian Rhapsody
Ottorino Respighi
Adagio con variazioni for Cello and Orchestra
Nikolai Rimsky-Korsakov
Sérénade, Op. 37 (1893,1903)
Julius Röntgen
 Two Irish folk melodies (1912)
 Shule Aroon
 Bean Mhic A'Mhaoir
Joseph-Guy Ropartz
Rhapsodie pour violoncelle et orchestre (1928)
Edmund Rubbra
Soliloquy for cello, horns strings and timpani, Op. 57 (1947)
Dorian Rudnytsky
 Costa Blanca Suite (2005)
Camille Saint-Saëns
Allegro appassionato in B minor, Op. 43
Romance, Op. 36
Suite in D minor, Op. 16 bis for cello and orchestra
Aulis Sallinen
 Nocturnal Dances of Don Juan Quixote for Cello and String Orchestra, Op. 58
William Schuman
Song of Orpheus (1961) 
Charles Villiers Stanford
Rondo for Cello and Orchestra in F major (1869)
Irish Rhapsody No. 3 for Cello and Orchestra, Op. 137 (1913)
Ballata and Ballabile for Cello and Orchestra, Op. 160 (1918)
Richard Strauss
Romance for cello and (piano or) orchestra, AV75 (1883)
Igor Stravinsky
Italienische Suite, (transcribed for cello and chamber orchestra by Vassily Lobanov) (1985)
Alexandre Tansman
Fantaisie (1937)
Les Dix commandements (1979)
Pyotr Ilyich Tchaikovsky
Variations on a Rococo Theme, Op. 33, 1876, rev. 1878
Pezzo Capriccioso, Op. 62
 Norturne, Op. 19, No. 4
 Andente Cantabile, Op. 11 (from String Quartet No. 1)
Andrew Lloyd Webber
Variations for cello and band or orchestra
Julian Lloyd Webber
Jackie's Song, for cello and strings
Carl Maria von Weber
Potpourri, Op. 20 (1808)
Mieczysław Weinberg
Fantasy for Cello and Orchestra (1956)
Graham Whettam
Ballade Hebraique (1999)

See also
Concerto
Cello concerto
List of solo cello pieces
List of compositions for cello and piano
String instrument repertoire
List of compositions for cello and organ
List of compositions for cello and piano
List of double concertos for violin and cello
List of triple concertos for violin, cello, and piano
List of compositions for violin and orchestra

References

External links
 Concertos and other works and chronology in large index
 A reference source on the composers of the 18th century

 
Cello and orchestra